Raghubir Mahaseth is a well-renowned Nepalese politician. Mahaseth is currently serving as the Central Secretary of  CPN UML, is the in-charge of the Madhesh Province of Nepal for CPN UML, and is the member of House of Representatives of the federal parliament of Nepal. He previously served as the Deputy Prime Minister and Minister of Foreign Affairs in 2021, Ministry of Physical Infrastructure and Transport  from 2018 to 2020, and the  Minister of Irrigation in 2011.

Electoral history 
He has been elected to the Pratinidhi Sabha from Dhanusha-4 2017 on a CPN (UML) ticket. He contested 1999 elections from Marxist–Leninist for the first time. He contested election but won only in 2009 by-election from Dhanusha-5 and  2017 election from Dhanusha-4 once each

1999 legislative elections

2008 Constituent Assembly election

2013 Constituent Assembly election 
Dhanusha-5

2017 legislative elections

See also
 2022 Janakpur municipal election
 Satrudhan Mahato

References

External links
 Official website of Nepal Communist Party
 Official website of Ministry of Physical Infrastructure and Transport

Living people
Nepal Communist Party (NCP) politicians
Nepal MPs 2017–2022
Deputy Prime Ministers of Nepal
Members of the 1st Nepalese Constituent Assembly
Communist Party of Nepal (Unified Marxist–Leninist) politicians
1961 births
Nepal MPs 2022–present